Sulaimān ibn Dāwūd was, according to the Quran, a malik and nabī of the Israelites. Generally, Islamic tradition holds that he was the third king of the Jewish people and a wise ruler of Israel.

In Islam, Solomon is regarded as one of the prophets of God who was bestowed with many divine gifts, including the ability to speak to both animals and jinn; he is also said to have enslaved the shayāṭīn and the dīv with the support of a staff or ring given to him by God.

Muslims further maintain that he remained a faithful monotheist throughout his life; reigned justly over the whole of the Israelite nation; was blessed with a level of kingship that was given to none before him nor after him; and fulfilled all of his commandments, being promised nearness to God in Jannah at the end of his life. Since the rise of Islam, various Arab historians have regarded Solomon as one of the greatest rulers in history.

Quran and interpretation

Judgment on the field 
In the earliest narrative involving Sulaiman, the Quran (21:78) briefly alludes to a story that Sulaiman was in the company of his father, when two men came to ask David to judge between them regarding a ḥarth (field). Later Muslim commentators expanded on the allusion, including Al-Tabari, Baidawi, and Ibn Kathir. They said that the first of the two men said that he owned a vineyard of which he took great care the whole year through. But one day, when he was absent, the other man's sheep had strayed into the vineyard and devoured the grapes. He asked to be compensated for this damage. Upon hearing the man's complaint, Solomon suggested that the owner of the sheep take the other man's vineyard to repair and cultivate until the vines returned to their former state, whereupon he should return it to its owner. At the same time, the owner of the vineyard would care for the sheep and benefit from their wool and milk until his land was returned to him, at which point he would return the sheep to their owner. This response shows Solomon's level of judgment, which, the Quran says, would characterize Sulaiman throughout his life. Ḥikmah (Wisdom), according to Muslim tradition, would always be associated with Solomon, who would later even be referred to as Sulaimān al-Ḥakīm ("Sulaiman the Wise"). This story is adapted in the Kebra Nagast, but as a dispute adjudicated by a son of Sulaiman.

Solomon and the demons 

The Quran narrates that the wind was made subservient to Solomon, and he could control it at his own will, and that the jinn also came under Solomon's control. The jinn helped strengthen Solomon's reign. The devils (shayatin), and demons were forced building for him monuments. God also caused a miraculous ʿayn ('fount' or 'spring') of molten qiṭr ('brass' or 'copper') to flow for Solomon, to be used by the demons in their construction.

When David died, Solomon inherited his position as the prophetic king of the Israelites. Solomon once permitted a woman to build a statue of her father. Later, she began to worship the statue and Solomon was rebuked for tolerating idolatry in his kingdom. As a punishment, God enabled one of the enslaved demons to steal Solomon's ring and take over his kingdom (Surah 38:34). He later repents his sin and gains control over the demons again, focusing on building the temple again. He prayed to God to grant him a kingdom which would be unlike any after him. God accepted Solomon's prayer and gave him what he pleased.

Construed allegorically, Solomon's loss of his ring to the demons, may be understood to represent a human losing its soul to demonic passion. Attar of Nishapur writes: "If you bind the div (demon), you will set out for the royal pavilion with Solomon" and "You have no command over your self's kingdom, for in your case the div is in the place of Solomon".

Unlike the Talmudic tradition, Solomon was unaware and never participated in idolatry. Further, the Quran rejects that Solomon was a magician: "Solomon did not disbelieve, but the devils disbelieved, teaching men magic and ...". (2:102)

Solomon and the ant 
Solomon was even taught the languages of various animals, such as ants. The Quran recounts that, one day, Solomon and his army entered a wādin-naml (valley of the ant). On seeing Solomon and his army, a namlah (female ant) warned all the others to "get into your habitations, lest Solomon and his hosts crush you (under foot) without knowing it." Immediately understanding what the ant said, Solomon, as always, prayed to God, thanking him for bestowing upon him such gifts and further avoided trampling over the ant colonies. Solomon's wisdom, however, was yet another of the gifts he received from God, and Muslims maintain that Solomon never forgot his daily prayer, which was more important to him than any of his gifts.

Exegetical literature emphasizes the ant's wisdom and explains the meaning behind Solomon's gift to control the wind. According to Siracü'l-Kulub, the ant asks Solomon if he knows why he is called "Solomon" (Süleyman). Solomon says he does not, whereupon the ant goes on to explain: "Although your heart was sound (selim) and you know the circumstances of the next world, you have accepted a few pleasures of this world and have been deceived by its possession and kingship; therefore you are called Solomon." Afterwards the ant asks Solomon, if he knows why God has subdued the wind for him. Once again, Solomon says no and the ant answers: "He has subdued the wind for a reason: that which you have accepted is nothing. Just as the wind passes, the world's wealth and kingship pass too." Scholars like Fakhr al-Din Razi and al-Qurtubi elevated the ant to the rank of an exemplar for humans to follow.

Conquest of Saba' 

Another important aspect of Solomon's kingship was the size of his army, which consisted of both men and jinn. Solomon would frequently assess his troops and warriors as well as the jinn and all the animals who worked under him. One day, when inspecting his troops, Solomon found the Hud-hud (Hoopoe) missing from the assembly. Soon afterwards, however, the Hud-hud arrived at Solomon's court, saying "I have compassed (territory) which thou hast not compassed, and I have come to thee from Saba' with tidings true." The Hud-hud further told Solomon that the people of Sheba worshiped the Sun, and that the woman who ruled the kingdom was highly intelligent and powerful. Solomon, who listened closely, chose to write a letter to the land of Sheba, through which he would try to convince the people of Sheba to cease their idolatrous worship of the Sun, and come to the worship of God. Solomon ordered the Hud-hud to give the letter to the Queen of Sheba (Bilqis), and then to hide and observe her reaction. The Hud-hud accepted Solomon's orders, and flew straight back to Sheba to deliver the letter to the Queen. The Queen then called her ministers to court and read aloud to them the letter from Solomon stating to the people of Sheba: "In the name of Allah the Compassionate the Merciful, Be you not exalted against me, but come to me as Muslimīn." She took counsel with her ministers and other court officials, saying "O my people, I know well that you are brave and mighty warriors, and that none on the face of Earth can stand against you, yet still would I know your minds upon this matter." The people of the court replied: "Yours is the power, O queen, and whatsoever your command, we shall obey it." At length, however, the Queen came to Solomon, announcing her submission to God.

Solomon and the ifrit 
While Bilqis' was journeying to Solomon's court, the king bid his servants deliver her throne thither before her arrival. An ifrit offered his services (Q27:38-40), but Solomon declined, entrusting this task instead to a manservant, who, being a pious fellow, prayed to God to move the throne for him. Marvellous to relate, his prayer was answered, the throne appearing in Solomon's palace by the power of God. When Bilqis arrived, Solomon asked her if she recognised her throne, but she, struggling to grasp the miracle God had wrought, gave the king an evasive answer, before finally adopting the faith of Solomon, won over by the evidence that the miracle was not that of a mere Ifrit but that of God himself. Solomon declined the ifrit's tempting offer, because he sought to rely solely upon God and not upon a demon or any other created being, and was rewarded for his piety with success in converting Bilqis to the true faith.

Death 

The Quran relates that Solomon died while he was leaning upon his staff and that he remained standing, propped up by it, until a little creature – ant or worm – gnawed at it, until, finally, it gave way – and only then did his body collapse. 

As he remained upright, propped on his staff, the jinn thought he was still alive and supervising them.

They realized the truth only when God sent a creature to crawl out of the ground and gnaw at Solomon's staff, until his body collapsed. This verse is understood to teach the audience that jinn do not know the unseen (Al-Ghaib) – had they known it, they would not have remained toiling like fools in the service of a dead man.

Mahammaddim in the Song of Solomon 

As inspired by verses of the Quran, some Muslims believed that Muhammad (consonant letters: m-ħ-m-d) is mentioned in the Song of Songs (5:16) as 'Mahammaddim' (consonant letters: m-ħ-m-d-y-m), even though the latter word is translated as "desirable" or "lovely" by Jews.

Solomon and Jamshid 

Jamshid was the fourth king of the world, according to the Shāhnāma of the poet Firdausī. Like Solomon, he was believed to have had command over all the angels and demons of the world, and was both king and high priest of Hormozd (middle Persian for Ahura Mazda). He was responsible for many great inventions that made life more secure for his people: the manufacture of armor and weapons, the weaving and dyeing of clothes of linen, silk and wool, the building of houses of brick, the mining of jewels and precious metals, the making of perfumes and wine, the art of medicine, the navigation of the waters of the world in sailing ships. He Jamshid had now become the greatest monarch the world had ever known. He was endowed with the royal farr (Avestan: khvarena), a radiant splendor that burned about him by divine favor.

Due to similarities between the two wise monarchs,  some traditions conflate the two. For example, Solomon was associated with ruling over the southwestern Iran in the works of al-Balkhi. Persepolis was believed to be the seat of Solomon and described as "playground of Solomon" by scholars such as Mas'udi, Muqaddasi and Istakhri. Other Muslim authors have opposed the belief that Solomon once ruled in Iran, arguing that any similarities between the lives and deeds of Solomon and Jamshid are purely coincidental, the two being distinct and separate personages. The latter view has been vindicated by scholarship in the field of Indo-European mythology, which has demonstrated conclusively that the character Jamshid derives from the early Zoroastrian deity Yima, whereas Quranic and Biblical scholarship support a measure of historicity for the wise prophet king.

See also 
 Biblical narratives and the Quran
 Harut and Marut
 Legends and the Quran
 Qiṣaṣ al-Anbiyāʾ ("Stories of the Prophets")
 Queen of Sheba
 Sulayman
 Sūrat an-Naml ("Chapter of the Ant")
 The Kingdom of Solomon

References to Solomon in the Quran 
 Solomon judged: 
 Fitnah to Solomon: 
 Solomon and the Queen of Sheba: , 
 Solomon's death:

References 

Islam
Hebrew Bible prophets of the Quran